Gary McDonald (born 20 November 1969) is an English former professional footballer who played in the Football League for Mansfield Town.

References

1969 births
Living people
English footballers
Association football forwards
English Football League players
Ipswich Town F.C. players
Mansfield Town F.C. players
Blyth Spartans A.F.C. players
Gateshead F.C. players